Microhydromys is a genus of rodent in the family Muridae. 
It contains the following species:
 Southern groove-toothed moss mouse (Microhydromys argenteus)
 Northern groove-toothed shrew mouse (Microhydromys richardsoni)

References

 
Rodent genera
Taxa named by George Henry Hamilton Tate
Taxonomy articles created by Polbot